Harald Haas born 1968 in Neustadt an der Aisch FRSE is a German Professor of Mobile Communications at the University of Strathclyde and is the person who coined the term Li-Fi. In 2012 he was one of the co-founders of pureVLC (now pureLiFi). Haas was elected a Fellow of the Royal Society of Edinburgh in 2017.

References

External links
 Includes list of publications
 

German engineers
Alumni of the University of Edinburgh
Academics of the University of Edinburgh
Place of birth missing (living people)
Living people
1968 births
Engineers from Bavaria